Major General John Hamilton "Ham" Roberts  (December 21, 1891 – December 17, 1962) was a Canadian Army officer who served in both of the world wars.

Biography
Roberts was born in Pipestone, Manitoba. He studied in Upper Canada College and graduated from the Royal Military College of Canada in Kingston, Ontario, in 1914, student No. 891.

From 1939, he commanded the 1st Field Regiment, RCA, in northern France, and was serving in that position when the Germans began the Battle of France in May 1940. Roberts managed to save his regiment's guns while evacuating from Brest in Brittany during the unsuccessful attempt to establish a second British Expeditionary Force in France after the evacuation at Dunkirk. He was later promoted to major-general and appointed General Officer Commanding the 2nd Canadian Division in 1941.

Roberts was put in charge of the ground troops for the raid against Dieppe, on August 19, 1942. His command post was aboard , and due to poor communications he had no idea how his troops were managing, until they called for landing craft for immediate evacuation. Roberts was criticized for unnecessarily committing his reserve troops (Les Fusiliers Mont-Royal) and inadvertently increasing the casualties. He was relieved of his command six months later. It was Roberts's inept performance during a war-game codenamed Operation Spartan in March 1943 rather than the Dieppe raid, which ended Roberts's career. General Harry Crerar reprimanded Roberts for the poor co-ordination between the 2nd Division's artillery and infantry during Operation Spartan war-games, and that Roberts failed to have forces dig in after seizing a bridgehead despite having ample time to do so. After Operation Spartan, Roberts was judged unfit to hold a combat command. He was sent to command reinforcement units in the United Kingdom and received no further operational commands. He later retired to the Channel Islands where he died in 1962.

References

4237 Dr. Adrian Preston & Peter Dennis (Edited) "Swords and Covenants" Rowman And Littlefield, London. Croom Helm. 1976.
H16511 Dr. Richard Arthur Preston "To Serve Canada: A History of the Royal Military College of Canada" 1997 Toronto, University of Toronto Press, 1969.
H16511 Dr. Richard Arthur Preston "Canada's RMC - A History of Royal Military College" Second Edition 1982
H1877 R. Guy C. Smith (editor) "As You Were! Ex-Cadets Remember". In 2 Volumes. Volume I: 1876-1918. Volume II: 1919-1984. Royal Military College. [Kingston]. The R.M.C. Club of Canada. 1984

External links
Juno Beach Centre, short biography on Roberts
Major General John Hamilton Roberts Canadian Army Journal Vol 12.2 Summer 2009
Royal Canadian Artillery Museum Great Gunners John Hamilton Roberts
Generals of World War II

1891 births
1962 deaths
Canadian Companions of the Order of the Bath
Canadian Companions of the Distinguished Service Order
Canadian recipients of the Military Cross
People from Westman Region, Manitoba
Royal Military College of Canada alumni
Canadian military personnel of World War I
Canadian Army generals of World War II
Canadian military personnel from Manitoba
Canadian Expeditionary Force officers
Canadian generals
Royal Regiment of Canadian Artillery officers